Cambridge House Grammar School is a mixed grammar school in the County Antrim town of Ballymena, Northern Ireland, within the North Eastern Region of the Education Authority.

General
The school is located in the Galgorm Road area of the town at a mature site surrounded by gardens and playing fields comprising almost. The main school buildings are contemporary and the campus was refurbished in 2001 prior to the opening of the new school. The Technology and Design Suite building is the most recent addition to the school. The school also includes a separate Drama and Media annexe and a self-contained, Sixth Form Centre complete with both private and communal study areas, a common room and a coffee shop.

The House System 
Cambridge House Grammar School (CHGS) is split into five houses (there having previously been four in the former Cambridge House Boy's Grammar School- Adair, Eaton, Raphael and Chichester), and the pastoral care of each pupil is enforced by this system. The house system is based on patrons who are successful in a wide range of expertise, such as sports, business, science and the Arts. The ethos behind the house system is that each pupil can relate to a smaller unit within the school and have a sense of identity in such a large school. Each house is allocated a Senior Teacher, and a team of seven group tutors. Houses foster the development of leadership skills in the pupils, as House Prefects are elected in year 11. Each house has a separate colour, house charity and house ties, with the house crest emblazoned in the middle.

The houses, and their original patrons, are listed below.

Jones House: Marie Jones, Belfast born playwright.
Burnell House:	Professor Dame Jocelyn Bell Burnell, physicist.
Abercorn House: Sacha, Duchess of Abercorn, OBE
Patton House: David Patton, local businessman.
Robinson House: Brian Robinson, former Ulster and Ireland rugby player and past pupil.

Notable former pupils
Adrian McCoubrey, professional cricketer, held the office of Deputy Head Boy 1997/98
Brian Robinson, rugby player, Irish international
Jamie Smith, Current Ulster Rugby Full-back, Jamie completed five years at the school
Carol Graham, contemporary artist.

References

Grammar schools in County Antrim

2001 establishments in Northern Ireland
Educational institutions established in 2001